Mavacamten, sold under the brand name Camzyos, is a medication used to treat obstructive hypertrophic cardiomyopathy.

Mavacamten is a cardiac myosin inhibitor. It was developed by MyoKardia, a subsidiary of Bristol Myers Squibb.

Mavacamten was approved for medical use in the United States in April 2022. The US Food and Drug Administration (FDA) considers it to be a first-in-class medication.

Medical uses 
Mavacamten is indicated for the treatment of adults with symptomatic New York Heart Association class II-III obstructive hypertrophic cardiomyopathy to improve functional capacity and symptoms.

History 
Mavacamten was granted orphan drug designation by the U.S. Food and Drug Administration (FDA).

Society and culture

Names 
Mavacamten is the international nonproprietary name (INN).

References

Further reading

External links 
 
 

Amines
Benzene derivatives
Benzyl compounds
Bristol Myers Squibb
Orphan drugs
Pyrimidines
Pyrimidones